The Syrian National Democratic Council (SNDC) is a Syrian political opposition council created in November 2011 to oppose the current Syrian government. The council consists of Syrian opposition figures in exile.

See also

Coalition of Secular and Democratic Syrians
Damascus Declaration
National Alliance for the Liberation of Syria
National Coalition for Syrian Revolutionary and Opposition Forces
National Coordination Committee for Democratic Change
National Democratic Rally
Popular Front for Change and Liberation
Supreme Council of the Syrian Revolution
Syrian National Council
Syrian Revolution General Commission

2011 establishments in France
Ba'athism
Organizations based in Paris
Organizations of the Syrian civil war
Political opposition organizations
Politics of Syria
Syrian opposition